Mayville is the name of a number of places:

United States
Mayville, Michigan
Mayville, Minnesota
Mayville Township, Houston County, Minnesota
Mayville, New Jersey
Mayville, New York
Mayville, North Dakota
Mayville, Wisconsin
Mayville, Clark County, Wisconsin

South Africa
Mayville, Durban
Mayville, Pretoria

See also
Maryville (disambiguation)
Marysville (disambiguation)
Maysville (disambiguation)
Maytown (disambiguation)